Cynthia Zamora (born April 8, 1938) is a Filipino actress. She was nominated for a FAMAS award for best actress in 1961 for Huwag Mo Akong Limutan and in 1957 for Wala Nang Luha. During her film career she played opposite Eddie del Mar, Mario Montenegro, and Danilo Montes. In the decades preceding 2007, Cynthia Zamora owned an antique store on Magnolia Street in Burbank, CA.

Filmography
1955 -Unang Halik  [Premiere]
1955 -Magia Blanca  [Larry Santiago]
1955 -Dakilang Hudas  [People's]
1956 -El conde de Monte Carlo  [People's]
1956 -Ambrocia  [Larry Santiago]
1956 -Heneral Paua [Larry Santiago], the story of General Jose Ignacio Paua, "who helped the Philippines in its struggle for liberty." It also starred Danilo Montes.
1956 -Prinsipe Villarba  [People's]
1956 -Exzur  [People's]
1956 -Cinco Hermanas  [Premiere]
1957 -Kim  [C. Santiago Film Org]
1957 -Barumbado  [People's]
1957 -Wala nang Iluha  [People's]
1957 -Pabo Real  [People's]
1957 -Kalibre .45  [Premiere]
1957 -Pusakal  [People's]
1958 -Marta Soler  [Premiere]
1958 -Sa Ngalan ng Espada  [Premiere]
1958 -Obra-Maestra  [People's]
1958 -Ramadal  [Premiere]
1959 -Hindi Kita Anak [Premiere]

References

External links
 
 Cynthia Zamora photo

Filipino film actresses
Living people
1938 births